Cebrella pellecebra, the three-spotted hedge blue, is a species of butterfly belonging to the lycaenid family described by Hans Fruhstorfer in 1910. It is found in  Southeast Asia.

Subspecies
Cebrella pellecebra pellecebra (Thailand, Malay Peninsula, Sumatra)
Cebrella pellecebra moultoni Chapman, 1911 (Sarawak)

References

Cebrella
Butterflies described in 1910